The 1987–88 NBA season was the Rockets' 21st season in the NBA and 17th season in the city of Houston. The Rockets finished fourth in the Midwest Division with a 46–36 record. Akeem Olajuwon was selected for the 1988 NBA All-Star Game. In the first round of the playoffs, the Rockets lost in four games to the Dallas Mavericks.

Draft picks

Roster

Regular season

Season standings

z – clinched division title
y – clinched division title
x – clinched playoff spot

Record vs. opponents

Game log

Regular season

|- align="center" bgcolor="#ffcccc"
| 2
| November 8, 19879:30p.m. CST
| @ L.A. Lakers
| L 92–101
|
|
|
| The Forum17,505
| 1–1
|- align="center" bgcolor="#ffcccc"
| 10
| November 24, 19877:00p.m. CST
| Detroit
| L 83–97
|
|
|
| The Summit16,611
| 6–4

|- align="center" bgcolor="#ffcccc"
| 24
| December 26, 19877:30p.m. CST
| @ Dallas
| L 100–105
|
|
|
| Reunion Arena17,007
| 12–12
|- align="center" bgcolor="#ccffcc"
| 25
| December 29, 19876:30p.m. CST
| @ Detroit
| W 101–91
|
|
|
| Pontiac Silverdome26,498
| 13–12

|- align="center" bgcolor="#ccffcc"
| 28
| January 4, 19887:30p.m. CST
| Dallas
| W 117–107
|
|
|
| The Summit16,611
| 16–12
|- align="center" bgcolor="#ffcccc"
| 35
| January 18, 19884:00p.m. CST
| @ L.A. Lakers
| L 110–121
|
|
|
| The Forum17,505
| 20–15
|- align="center" bgcolor="#ccffcc"
| 40
| January 30, 19887:30p.m. CST
| @ Dallas
| W 108–92
|
|
|
| Reunion Arena17,007
| 23–17

|- align="center"
|colspan="9" bgcolor="#bbcaff"|All-Star Break
|- style="background:#cfc;"
|- bgcolor="#bbffbb"
|- align="center" bgcolor="#ccffcc"
| 43
| February 9, 19887:30p.m. CST
| Boston
| W 129–120
|
|
|
| The Summit16,611
| 26–17
|- align="center" bgcolor="#ffcccc"
| 48
| February 18, 19887:30p.m. CST
| L.A. Lakers
| L 96–111
|
|
|
| The Summit16,611
| 29–19
|- align="center" bgcolor="#ffcccc"
| 51
| February 25, 19887:30p.m. CST
| Dallas
| L 106–108
|
|
|
| The Summit16,611
| 31–20

|- align="center" bgcolor="#ffcccc"
| 56
| March 4, 19887:00p.m. CST
| @ Dallas
| L 110–118
|
|
|
| Reunion Arena17,007
| 33–23
|- align="center" bgcolor="#ffcccc"
| 64
| March 22, 19889:30p.m. CST
| @ L.A. Lakers
| L 95–117
|
|
|
| The Forum17,505
| 38–26
|- align="center" bgcolor="#ffcccc"
| 68
| March 30, 19886:30p.m. CST
| @ Boston
| L 110–117
|
|
|
| Boston Garden14,890
| 40–28

|- align="center" bgcolor="#ccffcc"
| 78
| April 17, 198812Noon CDT
| L.A. Lakers
| W 127–119
|
|
|
| The Summit16,611
| 45–33
|- align="center" bgcolor="#ffcccc"
| 79
| April 19, 19887:30p.m. CDT
| Dallas
| L 96–104
|
|
|
| The Summit16,611
| 45–34

Playoffs

|- align="center" bgcolor="#ffcccc"
| 1
| April 28, 19887:30p.m. CDT
| @ Dallas
| L 110–120
| Olajuwon (34)
| Olajuwon (14)
| Floyd (11)
| Reunion Arena17,007
| 0–1
|- align="center" bgcolor="#ccffcc"
| 2
| April 30, 19882:30p.m. CDT
| @ Dallas
| W 119–108
| Floyd (42)
| Olajuwon (26)
| Floyd (9)
| Reunion Arena17,007
| 1–1
|- align="center" bgcolor="#ffcccc"
| 3
| May 3, 19887:30p.m. CDT
| Dallas
| L 92–93
| Olajuwon (35)
| Olajuwon (12)
| Floyd (5)
| The Summit16,611
| 1–2
|- align="center" bgcolor="#ffcccc"
| 4
| May 5, 19887:00p.m. CDT
| Dallas
| L 97–107
| Olajuwon (40)
| Olajuwon (15)
| Floyd (9)
| The Summit16,611
| 1–3
|-

Player statistics

Season

Playoffs

Awards and records
Akeem Olajuwon, All-NBA First Team
Akeem Olajuwon, NBA All-Defensive First Team
Rodney McCray, NBA All-Defensive First Team

Transactions

References

See also
1987–88 NBA season

Houston Rockets seasons